Baron Barnby, of Blyth in the County of Nottingham, was a title in the Peerage of the United Kingdom. It was created on 26 January 1922 for Francis Willey, head of Francis Willey & Co Ltd, wool merchants. The title became extinct on the death of his son, the second Baron, on 30 April 1982.

Barons Barnby (1922)
Francis Willey, 1st Baron Barnby (1841–1929)
Francis Vernon Willey, 2nd Baron Barnby (1884–1982)

Arms

References

Extinct baronies in the Peerage of the United Kingdom
Noble titles created in 1922